I Need an Angel is the second studio album from American singer Ruben Studdard. It was released on November 23, 2004 by J Records.

Reception

Charts
The album debuted at number 20 on the Billboard 200 U.S. album chart. It also topped the Billboard Gospel Albums and Year-End Gospel Albums charts.

Sales performance
An album of gospel music, it sold 96,000 in its first week and has since been certified Gold by the RIAA.

Track listing

Charts and certifications

Weekly charts

Certifications

Year-end charts

References

2004 albums
Ruben Studdard albums
Gospel albums by American artists
J Records albums
19 Recordings albums